Nepenthes stenophylla , or the narrow-leaved pitcher-plant, is a tropical pitcher plant endemic to Borneo. The species produces attractive funnel-shaped pitchers up to 25 cm high. It is listed as Least Concern on the IUCN Red List. Nepenthes stenophylla belongs to the loosely defined "N. maxima complex", which also includes, among other species, N. boschiana, N. chaniana, N. epiphytica, N. eymae, N. faizaliana, N. fusca, N. klossii, N. maxima, N. platychila, and N. vogelii.

Nepenthes fallax
There has been confusion surrounding N. stenophylla and N. fallax ever since the latter was first described. Nepenthes fallax matches N. stenophylla in most respects, except for the shape of the lid; the type specimen of N. fallax has an orbiculate lid, whereas that of N. stenophylla is narrow. However, the original description of N. stenophylla was based on a plant raised from seed in a greenhouse in England, and the narrow shape of the lid could be an aberrant characteristic resulting from artificial growing conditions.

In his seminal monograph "The Nepenthaceae of the Netherlands Indies", B. H. Danser treated N. fallax as a heterotypic synonym of N. stenophylla. This interpretation has been supported by most subsequent authors. Jan Schlauer, however, considers the taxa as two separate species based on the shape of the lid. He suspects the taxon originally named as N. stenophylla may have later been named again as N. faizaliana.

Nepenthes fallax has a separate conservation status of Vulnerable on the IUCN Red List.

Natural hybrids

The following natural hybrids involving N. stenophylla have been recorded.

N. fusca × N. stenophylla
N. lowii × N. stenophylla
N. rajah × N. stenophylla
N. reinwardtiana × N. stenophylla
N. stenophylla × N. tentaculata
N. stenophylla × N. veitchii

Notes

The specific epithet is derived from the  Latin word fallax, meaning "spurious".

References

Further reading

 Adam, J.H. 1997.  Pertanika Journal of Tropical Agricultural Science 20(2–3): 121–134.
 Bauer, U., C.J. Clemente, T. Renner & W. Federle 2012. Form follows function: morphological diversification and alternative trapping strategies in carnivorous Nepenthes pitcher plants. Journal of Evolutionary Biology 25(1): 90–102. 
 Beaman, J.H. & C. Anderson 2004. The Plants of Mount Kinabalu: 5. Dicotyledon Families Magnoliaceae to Winteraceae. Natural History Publications (Borneo), Kota Kinabalu.
 Bourke, G. 2010.  Captive Exotics Newsletter 1(1): 4–7. 
 Bourke, G. 2011. The Nepenthes of Mulu National Park. Carniflora Australis 8(1): 20–31.
 Burbidge, F.W. 1882. Notes on the new Nepenthes. The Gardeners' Chronicle, new series, 17(420): 56. 
 Chung, A.Y.C. 2006. Biodiversity and Conservation of The Meliau Range: A Rain Forest in Sabah's Ultramafic Belt. Natural History Publications (Borneo), Kota Kinabalu. . 
 Clarke, C.M. 2006. Introduction. In: Danser, B.H. The Nepenthaceae of the Netherlands Indies. Natural History Publications (Borneo), Kota Kinabalu. pp. 1–15.
 Corner, E.J.H. 1996. Pitcher-plants (Nepenthes). In: K.M. Wong & A. Phillipps (eds.) Kinabalu: Summit of Borneo. A Revised and Expanded Edition. The Sabah Society, Kota Kinabalu. pp. 115–121. .
 Damit, A. 2014. A trip to Mount Trus Madi – the Nepenthes wonderland. Carnivorous Plant Newsletter 43(1): 19–22.
 Fretwell, S. 2013. Back in Borneo for giant Nepenthes. Part 1: Mesilau Nature Reserve, Ranau. Victorian Carnivorous Plant Society Journal 107: 6–13.
 Hazebroek, H.P. & A.K. bin Abang Morshidi 2002. A Guide to Gunung Mulu National Park: A World Heritage Site in Sarawak, Malaysian Borneo. Natural History Publications (Borneo), Kota Kinabalu.
 Kurup, R., A.J. Johnson, S. Sankar, A.A. Hussain, C.S. Kumar & S. Baby 2013. Fluorescent prey traps in carnivorous plants. Plant Biology 15(3): 611–615. 
 Lee, C.C. 2000. Recent Nepenthes Discoveries. [video] The 3rd Conference of the International Carnivorous Plant Society, San Francisco, USA.
  Mansur, M. 2001.  In: Prosiding Seminar Hari Cinta Puspa dan Satwa Nasional. Lembaga Ilmu Pengetahuan Indonesia, Bogor. pp. 244–253.
  Mansur, M. 2007. Keanekaragaman jenis Nepenthes (kantong semar) dataran rendah di Kalimantan Tengah. [Diversity of lowland Nepenthes (kantong semar) in Central Kalimantan.] Berita Biologi 8(5): 335–341. Abstract
 Mansur, M. & F.Q. Brearley 2008. Ecological studies on Nepenthes at Barito Ulu, Central Kalimantan, Indonesia. Jurnal Teknologi Lingkungan 9(3): 271–276.
 McPherson, S.R. & A. Robinson 2012. Field Guide to the Pitcher Plants of Borneo. Redfern Natural History Productions, Poole.
 Meimberg, H., A. Wistuba, P. Dittrich & G. Heubl 2001. Molecular phylogeny of Nepenthaceae based on cladistic analysis of plastid trnK intron sequence data. Plant Biology 3(2): 164–175. 
  Meimberg, H. 2002.  Ph.D. thesis, Ludwig Maximilian University of Munich, Munich.
 Meimberg, H. & G. Heubl 2006. Introduction of a nuclear marker for phylogenetic analysis of Nepenthaceae. Plant Biology 8(6): 831–840. 
 Meimberg, H., S. Thalhammer, A. Brachmann & G. Heubl 2006. Comparative analysis of a translocated copy of the trnK intron in carnivorous family Nepenthaceae. Molecular Phylogenetics and Evolution 39(2): 478–490. 
 Mey, F.S. 2014. Joined lecture on carnivorous plants of Borneo with Stewart McPherson. Strange Fruits: A Garden's Chronicle, February 21, 2014.
 Miyagi, I. & T. Toma 2007. A new mosquito of the genus Topomyia (Diptera, Culicidae) from a Nepenthes pitcher plant in a Bario highland of Sarawak, Malaysia. Medical Entomology and Zoology 58(3): 167–174. Abstract
  Oikawa, T. 1992. Nepenthes stenophylla Mast.. In: . [The Grief Vanishing.] Parco Co., Japan. p. 61.
 Sacilotto, R. 2004. Experiments with highland Nepenthes seedlings: a summary of measured tolerances. Carnivorous Plant Newsletter 33(1): 26–31.
 Thong, J. 2006.  Victorian Carnivorous Plant Society Journal 81: 12–17.
 Thorogood, C. 2010. The Malaysian Nepenthes: Evolutionary and Taxonomic Perspectives. Nova Science Publishers, New York.

External links

 Nepenthes stenophylla in its natural habitat

Carnivorous plants of Asia
stenophylla
Endemic flora of Borneo
Plants described in 1890
Flora of the Borneo montane rain forests